Khalid Al-Hail is a prominent Qatari businessman who now resides in London and Monaco. A self-made billionaire with numerous business interests across the globe. He is the founder and president of the Qatar National Democratic Party (QNDP), which advocates for a constitutional monarchy in Qatar. Very active politically from 2016-2020 Al Hail has scaled back on his political rhetoric as he focuses more on his business interests and humanitarian efforts.

Once Chairman and CEO of Qatar Investment and Development Company, Al Hail is estimated to have a net worth of $57.8 Billion.

Al-Hail has several awards and was honoured with the “Freeman of the city of London” back in 2016.

A former associate of Qatar's ex-prime minister, Hamid bin Jassim, Al-Hail supports a "bloodless coup." As a result of his political activity, Al-Hail was jailed and tortured in Qatar. He moved to London in February 2015. He is often referred to in press reports as the leader of the Qatari National Democratic Party. Al-Hail is a distant relative of Sheikha Mouza Bint Nassir, whose son, Tamim bin Hamad Al Thani, is the current emir of Qatar.

Political Activity 

In 2010, Al-Hail helped form the Qatari Youth Rescue Movement. In 2014, Al Hail said membership had increased to 30,000. That same year, Al-Hail reported having more than 9,000 documents demonstrating the corruption of the Qatari officials.
Al-Hail supports Royal Family of Qatar and fight corruption in the country.

Al-Hail organized and financed the Qatar, Global Security and Stability Conference, held in London on September 14, 2017. Foreign policy experts from the United States, United Kingdom and the Gulf discussed Qatar's support of terrorism, human rights abuses and its strained relationship with its Gulf neighbors. Speakers included Lord Paddy Ashdown, Ambassador Bill Richardson, Iain Duncan Smith, Member of Parliament Daniel Kawczynski and General Chuck Wald, Brigadier General Shlomo Brom.

References

Living people
Qatari politicians
Qatari businesspeople
Year of birth missing (living people)